(formerly CSK Research Institute Corp.) is a Japanese developer providing middleware for use in the video game industry. From the early nineties, CRI was a video game developer, but shifted focus in 2001.

History
CRI started out as CSK Research Institute, subsidiary of CSK, producing video games for the Mega Drive/Genesis. It went on to develop games for the Sega Saturn and Dreamcast before it was incorporated as CRI Middleware in 2001. In 2006, CRI Middleware introduced the CRIWARE brand.

Games

Developed

Published

CRIWARE

CRI ADX

CRI ADX is a streamed audio format which allows for multiple audio streams, seamless looping and continuous playback (allowing two or more files to be crossfaded or played in sequence) with low, predictable CPU usage. The format uses the ADPCM framework.

CRI Sofdec

CRU Sofdec is a streamed video format supporting up to 24bit color which includes multistreaming and seamless playback with a frame rate of up to 60 frames per second. It is essentially a repackaging of MPEG-1/MPEG-2 video with CRI's proprietary ADX codec for audio playback.

CRI Clipper
CRI Clipper is an automated lip-syncing program which analyzes waveforms and outputs an appropriate lip pattern into a text file, for later substitution into the facial animations of the (in-game) speaker.

CRI ROFS
CRI ROFS is a file management system for handling a virtual disc image, an extension of the CD-ROM standard. It has no limitations on file name format, or number of directories or files, and has been designed with compatibility with ADX and Sofdec in mind.

CRI Sound Factory
CRI Sound Factory is a GUI-based video game audio tool for effective sound design without input from programmers. It has support for the previewing and playback of generated audio.

CRI Movie Encode
CRI Movie Encode is a video encoding service by which CRI generates Sofdec or MPEG files from other media. For a fee (designated by the length of the file to be encoded), files are converted to the desired format with the quality specified by the client.

CRI Audio

CRI Movie

CRI Movie 2
CRI Movie with High Definition video support.

CRI Vibe

CRI CP Sound Craft

CRI FileMajik
CRI FileMajik - file system with features such as: asynchronous file requests, prioritized loads, zero-buffer decompression and UMD speed emulation for the PlayStation Portable.

References

External links

Middleware
Video game companies of Japan
Video game engines
Video game companies established in 1983
Japanese companies established in 1983